Steinbach is a small river of Baden-Württemberg, Germany. It is a left tributary of the Jagst in Steinbach an der Jagst.

See also
List of rivers of Baden-Württemberg

Rivers of Baden-Württemberg
Rivers of Germany